The 2016–17 Houston Cougars women's basketball team represented the University of Houston during the 2016–17 NCAA Division I women's basketball season. The season marked the fourth for the Cougars as members of the American Athletic Conference. The Cougars, led by third year head coach Ronald Hughey, played their home games at Hofheinz Pavilion. They finished the season 12–19 overall, 4–12 in AAC play to finish in tenth place. As the No. 10 seed in the AAC tournament, they advanced to the quarterfinals, where they lost to Temple.

Media
All Cougars games home and away are aired on the Houston Cougars IMG Sports Network, streamed online via the Houston Portal, with Gerald Sanchez and Louis Ray on the call. Before conference season home games streamed on Houston All-Access. Conference home games rotated between ESPN3, AAC Digital, and the Houston Portal. Road games typically were streamed on the opponents' websites, though some conference road games also appeared on ESPN3 or AAC Digital.

Roster

Schedule and results

|-
!colspan=12 style="background:#CC0000; color:white;"| Exhibition

|-
!colspan=12 style="background:#CC0000; color:white;"| Non-conference regular season

|-
!colspan=12 style="background:#CC0000; color:white;"| AAC regular season

|-
!colspan=12 style="background:#CC0000; color:white;"| American Athletic Conference Women's Tournament

|-

See also
 2016–17 Houston Cougars men's basketball team

References

External links
Official website

Houston Cougars women's basketball seasons
Houston
Houston Cougars
Houston Cougars